Reservoir is a non-residential suburb of Perth, Western Australia, and is located within the City of Kalamunda. It contains Lake C. Y. O'Connor, the lake created by Mundaring Weir, and was established as a suburb of Perth in 1997.

References

External links

Suburbs of Perth, Western Australia
Darling Range
Suburbs in the City of Kalamunda